MetroJazz was an American jazz record label founded in 1958 as a division of MGM Records. These records were produced by Leonard Feather and included Pepper Adams, Red Callender, Teddy Edwards, Thad Jones, Jimmy Knepper, Sonny Rollins, Randy Weston.

Discography

References

Jazz record labels